Boljunsko Polje ( or ) is a village in the municipality of Lupoglav, in Istria County, Croatia. In 2001, the village had 150 residents.

References

Populated places in Istria County